In molecular biology, glycoside hydrolase family 7 is a family of glycoside hydrolases.

Glycoside hydrolases  are a widespread group of enzymes that hydrolyse the glycosidic bond between two or more carbohydrates, or between a carbohydrate and a non-carbohydrate moiety. A classification system for glycoside hydrolases, based on sequence similarity, has led to the definition of >100 different families. This classification is available on the CAZy web site, and also discussed at CAZypedia, an online encyclopedia of carbohydrate active enzymes.

Glycoside hydrolase family 7 CAZY GH_7 comprises enzymes with several known activities including endoglucanase and cellobiohydrolase. These enzymes were formerly known as cellulase family C.

Exoglucanases and cellobiohydrolases play a role in the conversion of cellulose to glucose by cutting the disaccharide cellobiose from the non-reducing end of the cellulose polymer chain. Structurally, cellulases and xylanases frequently consist of a catalytic domain joined to a cellulose-binding domain (CBD) via a linker region that is rich in proline and/or hydroxy-amino acids. In type I exoglucanases, the CBD domain is found at the C-terminal extremity of these enzyme (this short domain forms a hairpin loop structure stabilised by 2 disulphide bridges).

References 

EC 3.2.1
GH family
Protein families